Dublin is a city in Franklin, Delaware and Union counties in the U.S. state of Ohio. The population was 49,328 at the 2020 census. It is a suburb of Columbus. The city of Dublin hosts the yearly Memorial Tournament at the Muirfield Village Golf Club. The Dublin Irish Festival (called Dublin Irish Days in 2021) advertises itself as the largest three-day Irish festival in the world.

History

Native Americans
Native Americans from the Hopewell, Adena, Delaware, Shawnee, and Wyandot were among the first known inhabitants of the countryside that was to become Dublin, Ohio.

The Wyandots had moved to the Ohio countryside after being decimated by disease and a disastrous war with the Five Nations of the Iroquois in their homeland near Georgian Bay. In 1794, General Anthony Wayne defeated the Wyandots and other Ohio American Indian peoples at the Battle of Fallen Timbers, leading to the Wyandot surrendering most of their land in Ohio with the signing of the Treaty of Greenville.

Chief Shateyaronyah, an important leader known to locals as "Leatherlips", signed the Treaty of Greenville on August 3, 1795, and encouraged cooperation with white settlers near the end of his life. That policy of accommodating Europeans led to conflict with a movement led by two Shawnee brothers, Tecumseh and Tenskwatawa (The Prophet). Tenskwatawa reacted strongly against Leatherlips and condemned him to death for signing away native lands, and for "witchcraft". More likely was that this was for his refusal to join the Shawnee. Rather than break the pledge that he signed in 1795, Leatherlips was killed in 1810. The Leatherlips sculpture in Scioto Park was created to honor Chief Shateyaronyah in 1990.

After the Revolutionary War, the United States Government gave  of land along the Scioto River to Lieutenant James Holt as payment for his service. In 1802, Peter and Benjamin Sells from Huntingdon, Pennsylvania, purchased  of this land for their brother, John. Today, the site of the John Sells' original purchase is known as Historic Dublin.

Post-Ohio statehood
In 1808, John Sells brought his family to the region, and by 1810, he had begun to survey lots for the new village with his business partner, an Irish gentleman named John Shields. According to historians, Shields is responsible for naming the town after his birthplace:

In 1833, Dublin contained several mills and one store, and was incorporated in 1881.

In 1970, Dublin was still a small town with only 681 residents. However, the construction of Interstate 270 facilitated a population boom, spearheaded by the acquisition of major corporate headquarters such as Ashland Inc and Wendy's International. In addition, the growth of the Muirfield Village Golf Club and its residential subdivision attracted numerous affluent citizens to the rapidly growing suburb. It was then officially declared a city in August 1987, after reaching a population of 5,000 residents. As part of this boom Dublin significantly expanded its area, annexing parts of Washington, Perry, Concord, and Jerome townships.

In 2017, out of over 15,000 towns and neighborhoods in the U.S., Dublin was ranked 6th best place to live in the United States. In 2020, Wallethub ranked Dublin the 12th Best Small City in America.

In 2020, the city began redeveloping the Bridge Street District. The  project includes 400 apartments and condominiums, retail, offices, and other space along the Scioto River.

Geography

The Scioto River passes through Dublin. In this area the river and its tributaries cut deep gorges through the limestone bedrock, and the riverbed is stony. Some of these tributaries feature waterfalls.

Topography
Located on the Glaciated Allegheny Plateau, Dublin has a relatively flat topography. Nevertheless, there are numerous ravines surrounding the tributaries of the Scioto River, which make for steep cliffs in some areas.

Demographics

According to a 2012 estimate, the median income for a household in the city was $114,183, and the median income for a family was $138,590. Males had a median income of $75,279 versus $43,903 for females. The per capita income for the city was $41,122. About 2.1% of families and 2.7% of the population were below the poverty line, including 2.7% of those under age 18 and 4.0% of those age 65 or over.

2010 census
As of the census of 2010, there were 41,751 people, 14,984 households, and 11,656 families residing in the city. The racial makeup of the city was 80.5% White, 1.8% African American, 0.1% Native American, 15.3% Asian, 0.5% from other races, and 1.8% from two or more races. Hispanic or Latino of any race were 1.8% of the population.

As of 2010, the Asian population is: 6.9% Indian, 3.1% Chinese, 2.6% Japanese, 1.3% Korean, 0.2% Vietnamese.

There were 14,984 households, of which 45.1% had children under the age of 18 living with them, 69.5% were married couples living together, 5.9% had a female householder with no husband present, 2.4% had a male householder with no wife present, and 22.2% were non-families. 18.4% of all households were made up of individuals, and 5.4% had someone living alone who was 65 years of age or older. The average household size was 2.78 and the average family size was 3.21.

The median age in the city was 38.3 years. 30.4% of residents were under the age of 18; 4.8% were between the ages of 18 and 24; 27.3% were from 25 to 44; 29.7% were from 45 to 64, and 7.8% were 65 years of age or older. The gender makeup of the city was 49.4% male and 50.6% female.

2000 census
As of the census of 2000, there were 31,392 people, 11,209 households, and 8,675 families residing in the city. The population density was 1,486.1 people per square mile (573.9/km2). There were 12,038 housing units at an average density of 569.9 per square mile (220.1/km2). The racial makeup of the city was 89.66% White, 1.73% African American, 0.08% Native American, 7.36% Asian, 0.02% Pacific Islander, 0.20% from other races, and 0.95% from two or more races. Hispanic or Latino of any race were 1.01% of the population.

There were 11,209 households, out of which 46.6% had children under the age of 18 living with them, 70.7% were married couples living together, 5.0% had a female householder with no husband present, and 22.6% were non-families. 18.5% of all households were made up of individuals, and 3.8% had someone living alone who was 65 years of age or older. The average household size was 2.80 and the average family size was 3.24.

In the city, the population was spread out, with 32.1% under the age of 18, 4.8% from 18 to 24, 33.4% from 25 to 44, 24.3% from 45 to 64, and 5.4% who were 65 years of age or older. The median age was 35 years. For every 100 females, there were 98.1 males. For every 100 females age 18 and over, there were 96.4 males.

Japanese population

As of 2011 Dublin has the highest concentration of Asians of any Ohio city. As of 2013 many Japanese expatriates working at Honda offices in the area live in Dublin. As of that year, in some subdivisions in Dublin, Japanese make up 20–30% of the residents. The community includes Japanese restaurants. A Coldwell Banker real estate agent named Akiko Miyamoto stated in Car Talk that the services provided for Japanese speakers by the Dublin City School District attract Japanese expatriates to Dublin.

Honda first established operations in Marysville in 1979. Japanese people began living in Dublin and other suburbs instead of Marysville because Dublin established a support system for Japanese residents and the suburbs offered Saturday schools for Japanese residents. As of the 2010 U.S. Census, 1,071 Japanese people live in Dublin, making up 2.6% of the city's population. And also as of 2010, 122 Japanese live in Union County, making up 0.2% of the county's population; Marysville is in this county. Holly Zachariah of The Columbus Dispatch stated that "It has been that way historically." According to the "2013 Japanese Direct Investment Survey" by the Consulate-General of Japan in Detroit, Dublin had 2,002 Japanese nationals, giving it the highest such population in the state.

Economy

Dublin is home to the headquarters of several companies, the largest of which is Cardinal Health, the company with the fifteenth-highest revenue out of any US company in 2022. IGS Energy, Stanley Steemer, Wendy's and Online Computer Library Center are all headquartered in Dublin as well. Pacer International, a larger intermodal logistics provider, was headquartered in Dublin until its acquisition by XPO Logistics on March 31, 2014. OhioHealth also has significant operations in the Dublin area through the Dublin Methodist Hospital.

Top employers
According to the City's 2020 Comprehensive Annual Financial Report, the top employers in the city are:

Education

Primary and secondary schools
The Dublin City School District has three high schools (Coffman, Scioto, and Jerome), five middle schools (Sells, Davis, Grizzell, Karrer, and Eversole) and fifteen elementary schools.  The 2020–2021 school-year enrollment for the district was 16,254.

The Hilliard City School District also serves a portion of the community. The Hilliard district operates one school, Washington Elementary School, in the city limits.

Area private schools include St. Brigid of Kildare Catholic School in Dublin, Meadows Academy, and St. Brendan School in Hilliard.

Post-secondary education
Ohio University Heritage College of Osteopathic Medicine, Columbus State Community College, Ohio Dominican University, University of Dayton, and Franklin University have branches in the city.

Public libraries

The Dublin Branch of the Columbus Metropolitan Library is located in the city. Nearby libraries include the Northwest Library and the Hilliard Branch.

Miscellaneous education
Tolles Technical School is in Plain City.

Columbus Japanese Language School, a Japanese supplementary school, holds its classes in Marysville,  and has its school office in Worthington. In March 2020 the school was intending to rent space at Glacier Ridge Elementary School in Dublin. It was held online for a year prior to it beginning its Marysville location in September 2021.

Parks and recreation

Dublin features  of parks, including  of scenic bike trails and 65+ developed parks with wooded natural areas and river frontage. Several Dublin parks are located along the Scioto River, including the two Dublin Kiwanis Riverway parks. The river is accessible at several points for small watercraft, and the nearby Griggs and O'Shaughnessy reservoirs allow motorboating and sailing.

The Rec Center is home to the Dublin Sea Dragons, a year-round competitive swim team.

Located on the outskirts of Dublin, Glacier Ridge Metro Park provides amenities and facilities for biking, disc golf, horseback riding, and picnicking. This park is not a part of the City of Dublin's parks, rather a unit of the Columbus and Franklin County Metroparks.

Arts and culture
Several of Dublin's parks are home to a unique assortment of outdoor sculptures—part of the Art in Public Places collection, established by the Dublin Arts Council. In 1988, the council developed the program to enhance the quality of life for residents and to establish a public art tour throughout the city to attract visitors. It has since become a nationally recognized program.

Ballantrae Park is located at the entrance of its namesake subdivision. An interactive play fountain is found at the base of the hill.

City events
Annual events include: St. Patrick's Day Parade, The Memorial Tournament, Memorial Day Ceremony, Independence Day Celebration, Dublin Irish Festival (the largest 3-day Irish festival in the world), Halloween Spooktacular, Veteran's Day Ceremony and Tree Lighting.

Golf courses and tournaments

The city has the following golf clubs:
 Muirfield Village Golf Club
 The Country Club at Muirfield Village
 Tartan Fields Golf Club
 The Golf Club of Dublin

Each year since 1976, in late May or early June, Muirfield Village Golf Club hosts the Memorial Tournament, a stop on golf's PGA Tour. The Muirfield Village Golf Club has hosted the 1987 The Ryder Cup and the 2013 The President's Cup, Tartan Fields Golf Club hosted the LPGA's Wendy's Championship for Children from 2002 through 2006, and the Riviera Golf Club (closed in 2014) was home to the American-Italian Golf Association.

Dublin also has a public golf course financed by the Muirfield association.

Religion

Approximately 35% of Dublin residents affiliate with some religious organization.  As such, Dublin is home to many religious organizations, two of which own buildings listed on the National Register of Historic Places (NRHP) (Dublin Community Church and Saint John Lutheran Church).  Diocesan Publications, a secular company that specializes in producing Catholic parish bulletins among other products, has an office in Dublin.  Ohio Dominican University and the University of Dayton, both Catholic universities, have branch campuses in Dublin.
{| class="wikitable"
|+ 
! Religious Organization !! Denomination or Governing Body
|-
| Berean Bible Church || Nondenominational
|-
| Champions in Christ Church || United Pentecostal Church International
|-
| The Church of Jesus Christ of Latter-Day Saints || Columbus Ohio North Stake
|- 
| Cypress Church || Wesleyan Church
|- 
| Discover Christian Church || Nondenominational
|- 
| Dublin Baptist Church || Southern Baptist Convention
|- 
| Dublin Community Church || United Church of Christ
|- 
| Dublin Presbyterian Church || Presbyterian Church (USA)
|- 
| Encounter Church || Fellowship of Grace Brethren Churches
|- 
| Faith Community Church || Evangelical Free Church of America
|- 
| Fellowship Baptist Church || General Association of Regular Baptist Churches
|- 
| First Apostolic Church || United Pentecostal Church International
|- 
| Indian Run United Methodist Church || United Methodist Church
|- 
| Northwest Chapel Grace Brethren Church || Fellowship of Grace Brethren Churches
|- 
| Northwest Presbyterian Church || Presbyterian Church in America
|- 
| Prince of Peace Lutheran Church || Evangelical Lutheran Church in America
|- 
| Radiant Life Church || Assemblies of God USA
|- 
| Saint Brigid of Kildare Church || Roman Catholic Diocese of Columbus
|- 
| Saint John Lutheran Church || Lutheran Church–Missouri Synod
|- 
| Saint Patrick's Episcopal Church || Episcopal Diocese of Southern Ohio
|- 
| Vineyard Church at Tuttle Crossing || Association of Vineyard Churches
|- 
| Vineyard Columbus Sawmill Campus || Association of Vineyard Churches
|- 
| Vista Community Church || Evangelical Covenant Church

|}

Transportation 

The suburban city is primarily accessed by car, with the main expressways serving the city being Interstate 270 (locally known as "the Outerbelt") and State Route 161 west of its interchange with 270. In the south, U.S. Route 33 flows through the city and runs concurrently with 161 between a roundabout in the center of Dublin and an interchange near a satellite campus of Ohio University. 161 and US 33 act as one of the main non-interstate roads through the historic part of Dublin. Additionally, Ohio State Route 257 runs from downtown Dublin's roundabout with 161 and US 33 to the city's north, and running parallel on the other side of the Scioto river is Ohio State Route 745, which also has a southern terminus in the historic part of Dublin. The Dublin Link, a pedestrian and cycling bridge, opened in March 2020.

The Central Ohio Transit Authority provides bus service in parts of the city: route 33 to parts of downtown and the Bridge Street District, while the rush hour route 73 provides express service from commercial areas to Downtown Columbus during rush hour periods.

Dublin's closest airport is the Ohio State University Airport, though general aviation and not regularly-scheduled commercial flights occur through the airport. Commercial flights to and from Dublin are handled mostly through John Glenn International Airport near the Columbus suburb of Gahanna, with a small amount of commercial flights flowing through Rickenbacker International Airport.

Notable people

 Alan Becker, online animator
 Jeremy Bobb, actor
 Eric Brunner, MLS defender
 Nate Ebner, NFL safety and rugby Olympian
 Nick Goings, NFL fullback
 Sean Kuraly, NHL forward
 Urban Meyer, Former head Coach of the Ohio State University
 Connor Murphy, NHL defenseman
 Chinedum Ndukwe, NFL safety
 Jack Nicklaus, iconic PGA champion in World Golf Hall of Fame
 Brady Quinn, NFL quarterback
 Chris Quinn, NBA guard
 Jay Richardson, NFL defensive end and local tv football analyst
 Mitch Rowland, Grammy award winning songwriter and lead guitarist in Harry Styles' band
 Ed Whitson, MLB pitcher
 Chris Wood, actor
 Vince Workman, NFL running back
 Garrett Wilson, NFL wide receiver for the New York Jets

See also

 Irish place names in other countries
 Dublin Core

References

External links

 City website
 Convention & Visitors Bureau
 

 
Cities in Ohio
Cities in Delaware County, Ohio
Cities in Franklin County, Ohio
Cities in Union County, Ohio
Populated places established in 1802
1802 establishments in the Northwest Territory
Irish-American culture in Ohio
Japanese-American culture in Ohio